Damon Kyle Wayans Jr. (born November 18, 1982) is an American actor and comedian. He is most widely known for starring as Brad Williams in the ABC sitcom Happy Endings, for which he was nominated for the Critics' Choice Television Award for Best Supporting Actor in a Comedy Series in 2012, and as Coach in the Fox sitcom New Girl. In 2014, he starred in the comedy film Let's Be Cops, and provided the voice of Wasabi in Big Hero 6.

He is the eldest son of actor and comedian Damon Wayans, and nephew of Keenen Ivory Wayans, Shawn Wayans, Kim Wayans, and Marlon Wayans.

Early life
Wayans was born on November 18, 1982, in Huntington, Vermont. He is a member of the Wayans family, the son of Lisa Thorner and actor and comedian Damon Wayans. He has three younger siblings: Michael, Cara Mia, and Kyla.

Career
Wayans made his film debut when he was cast in his father's feature film of 1994, Blankman, playing Young Kevin. He later appeared on his father's sitcom My Wife and Kids as John, one of Junior's friends. He later worked as a staff writer on the series. In fact, the character of Junior was loosely based on Wayans Jr. himself.

He appeared in and served as a writer on The Underground. Wayans Jr. also surprised audiences when he garnered a standing ovation during his debut appearance on Def Comedy Jam. He starred in the Wayans family comedy Dance Flick as the film's main character, Thomas.

From April 2011 to May 2013, Wayans starred as Brad Williams, one of the lead characters in the ABC comedy series Happy Endings, alongside Eliza Coupe, Elisha Cuthbert, Zachary Knighton, Adam Pally, and Casey Wilson. Despite critical acclaim and a cult following, the show was cancelled by ABC after concluding its third season on May 3, 2013.

Wayans was nominated for "Best Supporting Actor in a Comedy Series" at the NAACP Image Awards and Critic's Choice Television Awards for his work on Happy Endings.

On May 16, 2011, the Fox Network announced that it had picked up the Zooey Deschanel anchored comedy New Girl, which featured Wayans in the supporting role of Coach. However, Happy Endings had already been picked up for a second season on rival network ABC. The producers of New Girl initially planned to recast Wayans' role, but later decided not to recast nor reshoot the pilot episode in which he appeared. Instead, starting with the second episode, Wayans' character was substituted with Lamorne Morris, playing the role of Winston, a former roommate who had been pursuing a professional basketball career in Latvia.

With Happy Endings cancelled after its third season, it was announced in July 2013 that Wayans would return for at least four episodes of New Girl in the upcoming third season. In November 2013, it was announced that Wayans would remain on the show for the rest of Season 3. In May 2014, it was announced Wayans would return as a series regular for season four. In October 2018, it was announced that Wayans Jr. would be starring in a sitcom entitled Happy Together, alongside Amber Stevens West. It was cancelled after thirteen episodes, due to low ratings.

Personal life
Wayans has two daughters with ex-girlfriend Aja Metoyer. In 2016, Wayans married Samara Saraiva. The couple has two sons and two daughters together.

Filmography

Film

Television

References

External links

1982 births
American people of Malagasy descent
20th-century American male actors
21st-century American male actors
Male actors from Los Angeles
Male actors from Vermont
American male child actors
American male film actors
African-American stand-up comedians
American stand-up comedians
African-American screenwriters
American television writers
American male television writers
Living people
Damon Jr
African-American male actors
American male television actors
American male voice actors
Crossroads School alumni
Comedians from California
Screenwriters from California
20th-century American comedians
21st-century American comedians
20th-century African-American people
21st-century African-American people
African-American male writers